This is a list of aircraft of Canada's air forces.
Aircraft are listed for the following organizations:
 Canadian Aviation Corps (1914–1915) which operated a single Burgess-Dunne tailless floatplane
 Canadian Air Force (CAF) (1920–1924) while under the control of the Air Board.
 Royal Canadian Air Force (RCAF) (1924–1968) until amalgamated with the Royal Canadian Navy and Canadian Army to form a unified Canadian Forces.
 Canadian Forces (CAF/CF) (1968–2011) until Canadian Forces Air Command renamed Royal Canadian Air Force again
 Royal Canadian Air Force (2011–current)
This list only includes aircraft owned by the Canadian government, and excludes aircraft flown by Canadian pilots serving with the Royal Flying Corps, Royal Flying Corps Canada or Royal Air Force, including the Article XV squadrons.

From 1917 to November 1918 the British government funded and operated the Royal Flying Corps Canada (later Royal Air Force Canada) which trained aviators on the approximately 1,210 Curtiss Canucks built in Canada, 120 Curtiss JN-4s built in the US, as well as two Avro 504s and one Airco DH.6 built in Canada.

In 1918 the Canadian government formed the Canadian Air Force in Europe which consisted of two wings integrated into the normal Royal Air Force command structure, equipped with Sopwith Dolphins, Royal Aircraft Factory SE.5as and Airco DH.9As supplied and owned by the RAF. It was disbanded in 1920.
When the war ended some of these same types were offered to Canada as a part of the Imperial Gift, along with a batch of Fokker D.VIIs captured from Germany, which aside from some illicit flights were relegated primarily to storage and use as instructional airframes.

Independently of the RCAF, the Royal Canadian Navy (RCN) also operated aircraft; upon unification, CAF/CF assumed operational responsibility for all remaining RCN Canadair CT-133 Silver Star, Grumman CS2F Tracker, Sikorsky HO4S-3, and Sikorsky CHSS-2 Sea King aircraft.

Designations
During the First World War no official standards existed for the naming of aircraft and so all designations at this time were assigned by the original manufacturer and both numbers and names were used.
From 1918, aircraft were given names based on a set of rules, and individual variants designated numerically as mark I, mark II, etc. as per RAF practice, including aircraft purchased from American sources. For more information on specifics of the system, see British military aircraft designation systems.
Aircraft purchased from local sources often retained their original commercial names such as with the Barkley-Grow T8P-1 or the Waco AQC-6, particularly if purchased in small numbers, impressed or not purchased from the original manufacturer. 
CF-100 and CF-105 were Avro Canada company designations that preceded similar RCAF designations that became the basis for the Canadian Forces designations instituted in February 1968. Unlike the US designation system, there is only a single sequence rather than separate sequences for each role, and numbering started at 100, prefixed with C (for Canada) and a role letter or letters. According to R. W. Walker. 102 and 103 were not used in the CF system to avoid confusion with Avro's use of those numbers for the cancelled Avro Canada C-102 Jetliner and the Avro Canada CF-103 interceptor project.

Aircraft listing

See also

 List of active Canadian military aircraft
 List of aircraft of the Royal Canadian Navy

References

Notes

Citations

Bibliography
 Greenhous, Brereton; Halliday, Hugh A. Canada's Air Forces, 1914 - 1999. Montreal: Editions Art Global and the Department of National Defence, 1999. .
 Griffin, John A. Canadian Military Aircraft Serials & Photographs 1920 - 1968. Ottawa: Queen's Printer, Publication No. 69-2, 1969.
 Griffin, John A., Robert H. Smith and Kenneth D. Castle, Canadian Military Aircraft: Aircraft of the Canadian Armed Forces; Serials and Photographs, 1968-1998. Vanwell Publishing, St. Catharines, Ontario, 2005. 
 Hunt, C. W. Dancing in the Sky: The Royal Flying Corps in Canada. Toronto, Ont.; Tonawanda, NY : Dundurn Press. 2009. .
 Kostenuk, S. and J. Griffin. RCAF Squadron Histories and Aircraft: 1924–1968. Toronto: Samuel Stevens, Hakkert & Company, 1977. .
 Milberry, Larry. Sixty Years - The RCAF and CF Air Command 1924 - 1984. Toronto: Canav Books, 1984. .
 Molson, Ken M. and Harold A. Taylor. Canadian Aircraft Since 1909. Stittsville, Ontario: Canada's Wings, Inc., 1982. .
 R. W. Walker Canadian Military Aircraft Serial Numbers url: http://www.rwrwalker.ca/ accessdate: January 2014.
 Roberts, Leslie. There Shall Be Wings. Toronto: Clark, Irwin and Co. Ltd., 1959. No ISBN.
 Royal Flying Corps in Canada

External links
Royal Canadian Air Force - What IS that RCAF Bird Called?

Royal Canadian Air Force
Canada's Air Forces

Canadian military-related lists